Sjeng Schalken was the defending champion but lost in the quarterfinals to Michel Kratochvil.

Lleyton Hewitt won in the final 6–4, 6–2 against Kratochvil.

Seeds
The top eight seeds received a bye to the second round.

  Lleyton Hewitt (champion)
  Sjeng Schalken (quarterfinals)
  Rainer Schüttler (third round)
  Jonas Björkman (third round)
  Michel Kratochvil (final)
  Michael Chang (third round)
  Marcelo Ríos (quarterfinals)
  Francisco Clavet (quarterfinals)
  Lars Burgsmüller (third round)
  Harel Levy (second round)
  Nicolás Massú (third round)
  Andrew Ilie (first round)
  Álex Calatrava (first round)
  Wayne Arthurs (second round)
  Michael Russell (third round)
  Ramón Delgado (second round)

Draw

Finals

Top half

Section 1

Section 2

Bottom half

Section 3

Section 4

References
 2001 AIG Japan Open Tennis Championships Draw

Singles